Lee Da-yoon, better known as Spirit, is a Korean League of Legends player who is currently the jungler for the Afreeca Freecs in the LCK. Spirit has previously played for was Fnatic of the European League of Legends Championship Series (EU LCS). He has also played for MVP Blue, Samsung Galaxy Blue, and Team WE. Spirit joined fnatic on December 6, 2015 along with Noh “Gamsu” Yeong-jin.

Spirit left Fnatic on September 28, 2016 and returned to Korea, signing for the Afreeca Freecs after FNC failed to qualify for the 2016 League of Legends World Championship.

Tournament results

Samsung Blue
 3-4th - 2014 League of Legends World Championship

Team WE

Fnatic
 2nd — Intel Extreme Masters Season X – World Championship
 3rd  — 2016 EU LCS Spring playoffs
 5th — 2016 Summer EU LCS
 ? — 2016 Summer EU LCS playoffs

References

External links
 

Living people
Fnatic players
Team WE players
Samsung Galaxy (esports) players
League of Legends jungle players
Year of birth missing (living people)
South Korean esports players